The History of Mars may be
History of Mars observation
Geological history of Mars